Elvis Garcia Monteiro Évora (born 4 February 1978) is a Portuguese former basketball player who played as a center.

He played for Porto, from 1998/1999 to 2004/2005. After a season at Tenerife, he moved back to Portugal, playing for Ovarense, from 2006/07 to 2007/08, where he was twice National Champion. In 2008, he moved to Gandía BA, in Spain. With the season going, he signed for Benfica becoming a starter and a very important player for the team.
He plays for Portugal since 2000. He had 95 caps by October 2007. Elvis Évora played at the EuroBasket 2007 finals, where Portugal reached the 2nd phase.

Titles

Ovarense Aerosoles
 Liga Portuguesa de Basquetebol: 2
2006–07, 2007–08

Benfica
 Liga Portuguesa de Basquetebol: 4
2008–09, 2009–10, 2011–12, 2012−13
 Taça da Liga / Hugo dos Santos: 2
2010–11, 2012−13
 Supertaça: 3
 2008–09, 2009–10, 2012−13
António Pratas Trophy: 2
2008–09, 2011–12
Supertaça Portugal-Angola: 1
2009–10

External links
 LCB Profile
 EuroBasket 2007 Profile

1978 births
Living people
Cape Verdean men's basketball players
Centers (basketball)
Portuguese men's basketball players
Portuguese people of Cape Verdean descent
People from Sal, Cape Verde
FC Porto basketball players
G.D. Interclube men's basketball players
S.L. Benfica basketball players